Linda Eisenstein is an American playwright and composer.

Career
Linda Eisenstein is an author, composer, journalist and activist for the rights of women playwrights. Born in Chicago, raised in San Francisco and living now in Cleveland, Ohio, she is an active member of the International Centre for Women Playwrights, the Dramatists Guild and the American Society of Composers, Authors and Publishers (ASCAP). Since 1995, she has been a member of the Cleveland Play House Playwrights' Unit.

Eisenstein's award-winning plays and musicals have been produced throughout United States and Canada, England, Australia, and South Africa. She is the recipient of many awards, among them, three Ohio Arts Council Individual Artist Fellowships in Playwriting (1991, 1995, 2003). She holds a B.A., cum laude, from Cleveland State University (1971) and a M.A., summa cum laude, from the same university in Creative Writing (1994). She has also a rich experience in teaching playwriting, creative writing, and musical theatre. Her plays have been published by Dramatic Publishing Company and are available also in anthologies by Penguin, Vintage, Heinemann, Meriwether, and Smith & Kraus. Her poetry and fiction have appeared in several journals.

Also a theatre journalist and reviewer, Eisenstein is the chief theatre correspondent for angle: a journal of arts + culture and Cool Cleveland, and since 1992 has been a frequent contributor to the Cleveland Plain Dealer.

Works

Musicals
 The Last Red Wagon Tent Show in the Land (1986) - Music by Linda Eisenstein, Lyrics by Teddi Davis, Book by Eisenstein & Davis
 A Soldier's Passion or Dancing (1987) - Music by Linda Eisenstein, based on poems by Siegfried Sassoon
 Star Wares: The Next Generation (1989) - Music by Linda Eisenstein, Book & Lyrics by James Levin and Linda Eisenstein
 Street Sense (1991) - Music by Linda Eisenstein, Libretto by Migdalia Cruz
 The Chapel of Perpetual Desire Presents a Liturgical Circus of Religious Fervour and Live Sex on Stage (1992) - Music & Lyrics by Linda Eisenstein, Book by Linda Eisenstein, Amanda Shaffer, and James Levin
 Discordia (2003) - Music by Linda Eisenstein, Book/Lyrics by James Levin and Linda Eisenstein
 Becoming George (2004) - Music by Linda Eisenstein, Book/Lyrics by Patti McKenny and Doug Frew
 Holiday Hotline (2005) - Music by Linda Eisenstein, Book by Michael Sepesy, Lyrics by Linda Eisenstein, Teddi Davis, and Michael Sepesy

Full-length plays
 Three the Hard Way (1995)
 Rehearsing Cyrano  (2000)
 Eisenstein's Monster  (2004)

Play Collections
 Bad Grrrls: 11 short monologue plays for women (1997)
 Running from the Red Girl: And other short plays (1998)
 Intimate Relations (2000)

One act plays
 The Names of the Beast (1996)
 Marla's Devotion (1997)
 Pig Patter
 Revelation 24:12
 Running from the Red Girl (1996)
 That Was No Lady from the Sea
 Gentrification (1996)
 A Rustle of Wings
 Higher
 Heart Smart
 Optional, or How to Be Naked in Northern California
 Golden Gate
 Justice of the Peace
 Endorphins
 Training Horses (2001)
 Post-Structuralists and the Temple of Artifacts (1994)

Monologue plays
 At the Root (1994)
 Acme Temporary Services
 Balancing Act
 The Cassandra Complex
 The Club
 A Cock. A Dream. A True Story.
 Devils
 F2F
 In Illo Tempore (1994)
 Mrs. Jones Celebrates Valentine's Day
 Pretzels & Longing
 Style
 Ungrateful
 Welcome to the Vestibule
 Zombie Grrlz from the Crypt

References

External links
 official page
 Ohio State University library collection

American women composers
21st-century American composers
Year of birth missing (living people)
Living people
Cleveland State University alumni
21st-century American women musicians
21st-century women composers